Loch Erisort is an 8-mile-long narrow sea inlet on the east coast of the Isle of Lewis in the Outer Hebrides off the west coast of Scotland.

Its name is a relic of the Viking Age and came from Old Norse Eiríksfjorðr = "Eric's fjord".

 

Isle of Lewis